This is a list of current and former cinemas in Hong Kong.

Broadway Circuit

In addition to operating its own brand, Broadway Circuit also operates the B+, PALACE, Premiere Elements, MOViE MOViE and MY CINEMA chains. It previously run AMC-branded cinema in Pacific Place.

 Broadway Cinematheque
 Broadway Hollywood, at Plaza Hollywood
 Broadway Kingswood Ginza, at Kingswood Ginza
 Broadway Kwai Fong, at Metroplaza
 Broadway Mongkok, on Sai Yeung Choi Street South
 Broadway The ONE, at The ONE
 Broadway Tsuen Wan, at Tsuen Wan Plaza
 B+ apm, at apm
 B+ MOKO at MOKO
 PALACE ifc, at IFC Mall
 Premiere Elements, at Elements Mall (former site of The Grand Cinema)
 MOViE MOViE, at Cityplaza
 MOViE MOViE, at Pacific Place, Admiralty, Hong Kong
 MY CINEMA YOHO MALL, on Yuen Long

Former cinemas
 Broadway Kornhill, at Kornhill Plaza; closed in 2002; succeeded by MCL Kornhill
 Broadway Kowloon Bay, at Amoy Plaza; closed in March 2009 - now UA Amoy
 Broadway Olympian City, at Olympian City; closed on 16 September 2013 – now the sky by Golden Harvest, at Olympian City 2
 Broadway Yuen Long, at Sun Yuen Long Centre; closed on 6 March 2013  (Operation now focused on MY CINEMA, also located in the same YOHO MALL precinct)
AMC Pacific Place at Pacific Place, Admiralty, Hong Kong – renamed as MOVIE MOVIE on 5 August 2020
AMC Festival Walk, at Festival Walk, Kowloon Tong – now MCL Festival Grand
Broadway Cyberport, at The Arcade, Cyberport; succeeded by MCL Cyberport

UA Cinemas

The UA Cinemas brand in Hong Kong is not related to the United Artists Theaters chain in the United States, which is owned by Regal Cinemas.

On 8 March 2021, UA Cinemas announced that the business will cease business with immediate effect due to unavoidable and devastating pressure faced by the business since the outbreak of the coronavirus pandemic. 

Former cinemas
 UA Langham Place, succeeded by Cinema City
 UA Pacific Place, at Pacific Place; closed on 27 January 2006, succeeded by AMC Pacific Place
 UA Telford, succeeded by MCL Telford
 UA Times Square, at Times Square; opened in December 1993, closed in February 2012; the site was replaced by a Louis Vuitton store, and the UA theater was relocated to the 12th to 14th floor of the mall, renamed as CINE TIMES, opened in November 2013. Closed in March 2021, it was succeeded by Emperor Cinemas.
 UA Whampoa, opened in May 1985, closed in October 2009; succeeded by GH Whampoa
 Windsor Cinema, at Windsor House, Causeway Bay; closed in September 2015, succeeded by MCL Grand Windsor Cinema
 UA Cityplaza, at Cityplaza; closed on 23 February 2017, succeeded by MOViE MOViE by Broadway Circuit.
 UA TMT Plaza, at Tuen Mun Town Plaza; closed on 10 March 2018, succeeded by StagE by Golden Harvest.
 UA Shatin, at New Town Plaza; opened in 1985 as the first UA cinema in Hong Kong; closed in June 2018, succeeded by MCL Movie Town
 UA Cinema @ Airport, at Terminal 2, Hong Kong International Airport; houses the third (chronologically) IMAX theater in Hong Kong; closed in 2019 due closure of Hong Kong International Airport Terminal 2
UA Maritime, at Maritime Square; closed March 2021, succeeded by CineArt House
 UA K11 Art House, at K11 MUSEA; closed February 2021; revived by MCL
 UA Cine Moko, at MOKO-Grand Century Place, Mong Kok; closed March 2021, succeeded by B+ by Broadway Circuit.
 UA iSQUARE, at iSQUARE; houses the second (chronologically) IMAX theater in Hong Kong; closed March 2021, succeeded by Emperor Cinemas
 UA MegaBox, at MegaBox; houses the first (chronologically) IMAX theater in Hong Kong; closed March 2021, succeeded by GH Megabox
 UA Citygate, at Citygate; closed temporarily on 18 September 2016 for renovations; closed March 2021, succeeded By MCL Citygate
 UA Amoy, at Amoy Plaza; closed March 2021, succeeded By MCL Amoy

Orange Sky Golden Harvest

 Grand Ocean, at Ocean Centre Harbour City, Tsim Sha Tsui
 GH Fanling, at Fanling Town Centre
 GH Whampoa, at Whampoa Plaza, Whampoa Garden
the sky, at Olympian City 2
 StagE, at Tuen Mun Town Plaza
GH Megabox, at MegaBox

Former cinemas
 GH Hollywood, at Plaza Hollywood; closed on 31 March 2011; became Broadway Hollywood
 GH Mongkok, at Grand Century Place, 193 Prince Edward Road West - now UA Cine Moko.
 Golden Gateway, at The Gateway, Harbour City. (Operation now focused on Grand Ocean, also located in the same Harbour City precinct)
 GH Tsing Yi, at Maritime Square; closed on 3 January 2018; succeeded by UA Maritime
GH Citywalk, at Citywalk 2; succeeded by Emperor Cinemas

Newport Circuit

 Dynasty Theatre, on Mong Kok Road, Mong Kok
 Hyland Theatre, on Heung Sze Wui Road, Tuen Mun
 Newport Theatre, on Soy Street, Mong Kok
 President Theatre, on Jaffe Road, Causeway Bay

Former cinemas
 Century Theatre

MCL Cinemas

In addition to operating its own brand, MCL Cinemas also operates the Grand, Star Cinema, and the Movie Town chains.

 MCL JP Cinema, at JP Plaza, Causeway Bay
 MCL Kornhill Cinema, at Kornhill Plaza
 MCL Metro Cinema, at Metro City, Phase 2
 MCL South Horizons Cinema, at South Horizons
 MCL Telford Cinema, at Telford Gardens
MCL Cyberport, at Cyberport
 STAR Cinema, at PopCorn, Tseung Kwan O
 Grand Windsor Cinema, at Windsor House, Causeway Bay
 MCL Cheung Sha Wan Cinema, at Lai sun commercial centre, Cheung Sha Wan
 MCL Citygate, at Citygate Outlets, Tung Chung
Former cinemas
 The Grand Cinema, at Elements Mall (site acquired by Broadway and rebranded as Premiere Elements)

Chinachem Cinema Circuit

 Paris London New York Milano Cinema, at Hong Lai Garden, Tuen Mun

Former cinemas
 Chinachem Golden Plaza, in East Tsim Sha Tsui; opened in February, 1988, closed in May 2013

Pegasus Entertainment Holdings Limited

 Cinema City Mong Kok, at Langham Place
 Candy Park by Cinema City, at D·Park
 Cinema City Causeway Bay, at Jade & Pearl Plaza
 Cinema City Chai Wan, at Winner Centre
 Metroplex by Cinema City, at E-MAX

Emperor Cinemas 

 Entertainment Building, Queen's Road Central / D'Aguilar Street, Central
 Ma On Shan Emperor Cinema, in Sunshine City, Ma On Shan.
 Tuen Mun Emperor Cinema, New Town Commercial Arcade, 2 Tuen Lee St, Tuen Mun, in New Town Mansion Shopping Arcade
iSquare; replacing UA Cinemas
The Lohas
Citywalk, replacing GH Citywalk
Times Square, replacing CINE TIMES

Other cinemas

 Cine-Art House, at Amoy Plaza, Amoy Gardens; established in 1988 at the ground floor of Sun Hung Kai Centre, in Wan Chai; closed in 2006 and reopened in 2009 within Amoy Garden Shopping Arcade before its closure in 2018. It re-opens in 2019 at Kowloon City Plaza, followed by second branch at Maritime Plaza in 2021.
 Hong Kong Film Archive
 Louis Koo Cinema, Hong Kong Arts Centre, renamed in 2018
 L Cinema, on Mong Lung Street, Shau Kei Wan; opened on 8 February 2016
 Lux Theatre, on Bulkeley Street, Hung Hom; opened in 1971
 The Metroplex, at Kowloonbay International Trade & Exhibition Centre, Kowloon Bay; opened on 14 February 2014 
 Stanley Ho Space Theatre, within the Hong Kong Space Museum
 Yuen Long Cinema, on Yuen Long Pau Cheung Square, Yuen Long

Former cinemas

 Astor Theatre / Po Hing Theatre. Kowloon's first cinema. Now the location of the Eaton Hotel.
 Brightly Star, closed in 2008
 Capitol Theatre, Jardine's Bazaar, Causeway Bay; opened in 1952, closed in 1977
 Fanling Town Centre Cinema, in Fanling; opened in 1993, closed in 2006
 First Theatre, Public Square Street, 1925–1960s.
 Golden Valley Theatre, Hiu Kwong Street, Sau Mau Ping; opened in 1978, closed in 1992
 Hong Kong Opera House [2005-2008], No.4 Wah Lok Path. Formerly Fortuna Theatre [1979-2000]
 Isis Theatre, Moreton Terrace, Causeway Bay; opened in 1966, closed in 1999.
 Ko Shing Theatre, Sheung Wan (1870‐1970s). Hong Kong's second indoor opera‐cum‐movie theatre
 Kwong Chee Theatre, Temple Street / Kansu Street, 1919–1968. First cinema in Yau Ma Tei.
 Kwong Ming Theatre, Public Square Street, 1930-1960s.
 Kwun Chung Theatre, at 30 Kwun Chung Street, Kwun Chung; was Hong Kong's last adult cinema until it closed on 15 March 2011
 Lee Theatre; opened in 1927, closed in 1991.
 Liberty Theatre [1949-1997] Corner Temple Street & Jordan Road
 London Theatre at Corner Austin Road and Nathan Road, Jordan /倫敦大戲院 [1962-1988]
 Lung Wah Theatre, at 117 Chung On Street, Tsuen Wan; opened in 1962; closed in 1996
 Majestic Cinema Nathan Road / Saigon Street, 1928 ‐1940s/1940s– 1988/1992– 20004.
 Nanyang Theatre, Morrison Hill Road, Wan Chai; opened in 1966, closed in 1989.
 Olympia Theatre, Power Street, North Point; opened in 1965, closed in 1995.
 Park Theatre, Tung Lo Wan Road, Causeway Bay; opened in 1970, closed in 1997.
 Peng Chau Theatre, Peng Chau; opened in 1978, closed in the late 1980s
 Queen's Theatre, at the corner of Queen's Road Central and Theatre Lane, opened in 1924, closed for reconstruction in 1958, reopened in 1961, closed in 2007; the site is now occupied by LHT Tower
 Royal Cinema, closed in 2007
 Silver Star Cinema, closed in 1999
 Silver Theatre, in Kwun Tong; opened in 1963, closed in 2009; the building was demolished in 2013
 State Theatre, in North Point; operated from 1959 to 1997; formerly the Empire Theatre, which operated from 1952 to 1957
 Sunbeam Cinema, renovated into a stage theater in 2007
 Tai Ping Theatre
 Tuen Mun Cinema, closed in 2008 due to renovation in Tuen Mun Town Plaza
 Tung Hing Theatre (1867‐1910s). Hong Kong's first indoor opera‐cum‐movie theatre
 Universal Theatre / 民樂戲院 Located at Bowring Street, Jordan [1967-1995]
 Washington Theatre and Golden Harvest Theatre Both located at Woo Sung Street. Jordan
 Yau Ma Tei Theatre, opened in the late 1920s, closed in 1988
 Yuen Long Cinema, reopened as independent cinema

References

Further reading
 
 See p. 111 for the number of cinemas for the years between 1952 and 1996.

External links

Tube Hong Kong cinema list

Cinemas in Hong Kong
Lists of buildings and structures in Hong Kong
Hong Kong
Hong Kong film-related lists